Ariana Grande-Butera (born June 26, 1993) is an American singer, songwriter, and actress. She is noted for her four-octave vocal range and her signature use of the whistle register, which have received critical acclaim by critics and media. Her personal life and music has been the subject of widespread media attention. Grande has received numerous accolades throughout her career, including two Grammy Awards, one Brit Award, one Bambi Award, two Billboard Music Awards, three American Music Awards, nine MTV Video Music Awards, and 30 Guinness World Records. 

Grande began her music career at age 15 in the 2008 Broadway musical 13. She rose to fame for playing Cat Valentine in the Nickelodeon television series Victorious (2010–2013) and Sam & Cat (2013–2014). Grande signed with Republic Records in 2011 after label executives viewed YouTube videos of her covering songs. Her 1950s doo-wop-influenced pop and R&B debut album, Yours Truly (2013), topped the US Billboard 200, while its lead single, "The Way", reached the top ten of the US Billboard Hot 100. Grande's voice and whistle register on the album drew immediate comparisons to Mariah Carey.

She continued to explore pop and R&B in her second and third studio albums, My Everything (2014) and Dangerous Woman (2016). My Everything experimented with EDM and achieved global success with its singles "Problem", "Break Free" and "Bang Bang", while Dangerous Woman became her first of four consecutive number-one albums in the UK. Personal struggles influenced her trap-infused fourth and fifth studio albums, Sweetener (2018) and Thank U, Next (2019), both of which were critical and commercial successes. Sweetener won the Grammy Award for Best Pop Vocal Album, and Thank U, Next broke the record for the largest streaming week for a pop album and was nominated for Album of the Year. The singles "Thank U, Next", "7 Rings", and "Break Up with Your Girlfriend, I'm Bored" made Grande the first solo artist to hold the top three spots on the Hot 100 simultaneously and the first woman to succeed herself at the top of the UK Singles Chart. Her 2020 collaborations "Stuck with U" with Justin Bieber and "Rain on Me" with Lady Gaga helped her break the record for most number-one debuts on the Hot 100, the latter winning the Grammy Award for Best Pop Duo/Group Performance. Grande expanded on the trap genre with her sixth studio album, Positions (2020), which both the album and its title track debuted at number one in the UK and US. Her collaborations with The Weeknd on the remixes of "Save Your Tears" and "Die For You" garnered her sixth and seventh US number-one singles, respectively.

Often regarded as a pop icon and triple threat entertainer, Grande is one of the world's best-selling music artists; she has sold over 90 million records globally and all of her studio albums have been certified platinum or higher. Among her Billboard chart records, she is the first artist to have five number-one debuts, the first and only solo artist to chart three number one-debuts in one calendar year, and the only artist to debut the lead singles from each of her studio albums in the top ten, and to have their first five number one singles debut at top spot. Grande is the most streamed female artist of all time, the most streamed female artist on Spotify (2010s decade) and Apple Music, the most followed female artist on Spotify, and the most subscribed female solo artist on YouTube. Nine and seven of Grande's songs and music videos reached 1 billion streams and views on Spotify and Vevo, respectively. She is the female artist with the most one billion songs on the former platform. Grande has been included on Times annual list of the 100 most influential people in the world (2016 and 2019) and the Forbes Celebrity 100 (2019–2020). Grande was named Woman of the Year (2018), the greatest pop star of 2019, and the most successful female artist to debut in the 2010s by Billboard. Furthermore, Rolling Stone placed her in their list of 200 Greatest Singers of all time (2023). Aside from her music career, she has worked with many charitable organizations and advocates for animal rights, mental health, and gender, racial, and LGBT equality. Grande has a large following on social media; she became the most followed woman on Instagram in 2019, and has over 350 million followers as of 2023. Grande has also ventured into the cosmetics and fashion industries. Her fragrance line, which was released in 2015, exceeded $1 billion in sales though 2022.

Early life
Ariana Grande-Butera was born on June 26, 1993, in Boca Raton, Florida. She is the daughter of Joan Grande, the Brooklyn-born CEO of Hose-McCann Communications, a manufacturer of communications and safety equipment owned by the Grande family since 1964, and Edward Butera, a graphic design firm owner in Boca Raton. Grande is of Italian descent and has described herself as an Italian American with Sicilian and Abruzzese roots. She has an older half-brother, Frankie Grande, who is an entertainer and producer, Her family moved from New York to Florida before her birth, and her parents separated when she was eight or nine years old. Ariana has a close relationship with her maternal grandmother, Marjorie Grande.

When her parents were Florida Panthers season ticket holders, she was accidentally hit on each wrist by errant hockey pucks on two different occasions in 1998, sustaining minor bruises both times. The second occurrence happened during the Panthers' inaugural regular-season game at National Car Rental Center on October 9, 1998, in which she was also the first child to ever ride a Zamboni in the brand-new arena during the first intermission, the result of her parents' $200 winning bid at an auction. A photograph of her on the Zamboni was featured in the South Florida SunSentinel the next day. At age 8, she sang "The Star-Spangled Banner" at the Panthers' home game against the Chicago Blackhawks on January 16, 2002.

As a young child, Grande performed with the Fort Lauderdale Children's Theater, playing her first role as the title character in the musical Annie. She also performed in their productions of The Wizard of Oz and Beauty and the Beast. At age eight, she performed at a karaoke lounge on a cruise ship and with various orchestras such as South Florida's Philharmonic, Florida Sunshine Pops and Symphonic Orchestras. During this time, she attended the Pine Crest School and later North Broward Preparatory.

Career

2008–2012: Career beginnings and Nickelodeon
By age 13, Grande became serious about pursuing a music career, although she still concentrated on theater. When she first arrived in Los Angeles, California to meet with her managers, she expressed a desire to record an R&B album: "I was like, 'I want to make an R&B album,' They were like 'Um, that's a helluva goal! Who is going to buy a 14-year-old's R&B album?!'" In 2008, Grande was cast as cheerleader Charlotte in the Broadway musical 13. When she joined the musical, Grande left North Broward Preparatory School, but continued to be enrolled; the school sent her materials to study with tutors. She also sang various times at the New York City jazz club Birdland.

Grande was cast in the Nickelodeon television show Victorious along with 13 co-star Elizabeth Gillies in 2009. In the sitcom, set at a performing arts high school, she played the "adorably dimwitted" Cat Valentine. She had to dye her hair red every other week for the role, which severely damaged her hair. The show premiered in March 2010 to the second-largest audience for a live-action series in Nickelodeon, with 5.7 million viewers. The role helped propel Grande to teen idol status, but she was more interested in a music career, saying that acting is "fun, but music has always been first and foremost with me." Her character was compared to "Brittany Murphy's performance as the hapless Tai in Clueless" and described as being "very impressionable and easily swayed" but "generally sweet".

After the first season of Victorious wrapped, Grande wanted to focus on her music career and began working on her debut album in August 2010. To strengthen her vocal range, she began working with vocal coach Eric Vetro. The second season premiered in April 2011 to 6.2 million viewers, becoming the show's highest-rated episode. In May 2011, Grande appeared in Greyson Chance's video for the song "Unfriend You" from his album Hold On 'til the Night (2011), portraying his ex-girlfriend. She made her first musical appearance on the track "Give It Up" from the Victorious soundtrack in August 2011. While filming Victorious, Grande made several recordings of herself singing covers of songs by Adele, Whitney Houston and Mariah Carey, and uploaded them to YouTube. A friend of Monte Lipman, chief executive officer (CEO) of Republic Records, came across one of the videos. Impressed by her vocals, he sent the links to Lipman, who signed her to a recording contract. Grande voiced the title role in the English dub of the Spanish-language animated film Snowflake, the White Gorilla in November 2011. From 2011 to 2013, she voiced the fairy Princess Diaspro in the Nickelodeon revival of Winx Club.

In December 2011, Grande released her first single, "Put Your Hearts Up", which was recorded for a potential teen-oriented pop album that was never issued. She later disowned the track for its bubblegum pop sound, saying she had no interest in recording music of that genre. The song was later certified Gold by the Recording Industry Association of America (RIAA). On a second soundtrack, Victorious 2.0, released on June 5, 2012, as an extended play, she supplied vocals as part of the show's cast for the song "5 Fingaz to the Face". The third and final soundtrack, Victorious 3.0, was released on November 6, 2012, which featured a duet by Grande and Victoria Justice titled "L.A. Boyz", with an accompanying music video being released shortly after. In December 2012, Grande collaborated on the single version of "Popular Song", a duet with British singer and songwriter Mika.

After four seasons, Victorious was not renewed, with the finale airing in February 2013. Grande starred as Snow White in the pantomime-style musical theatre production A Snow White Christmas with Charlene Tilton and Neil Patrick Harris at the Pasadena Playhouse. She played Amanda Benson in Swindle, a 2013 Nickelodeon film adaptation of the children's book of the same name. Meanwhile, Nickelodeon created Sam & Cat, an iCarly and Victorious spin-off starring Jennette McCurdy and Grande. Grande and McCurdy reprised their roles as Cat Valentine and Sam Puckett on the buddy sitcom, which paired the characters as roommates who form an after-school babysitting business. The pilot aired on June 8, 2013, and the network immediately picked up the show. The next month, Nickelodeon doubled Sam & Cats original 20-episode order for season one, making it a 40-episode season. Despite its success in the ratings, the series was canceled after 35 episodes. The final episode aired on July 17, 2014.

2013–2015: Yours Truly and My Everything

Grande recorded her debut studio album Yours Truly, originally titled Daydreamin, over three years. It was released on August 30, 2013, and debuted at number one on the US Billboard 200 albums chart, with 138,000 copies sold in its first week. Yours Truly also debuted in the top ten in several other countries, including Australia, the UK, Ireland, and the Netherlands. Its lead single, "The Way", featuring Pittsburgh rapper Mac Miller, debuted at number ten on the US Billboard Hot 100, eventually peaking at number nine for two weeks. Grande was later sued by Minder Music for copying the line "What we gotta do right here is go back, back in time" from the 1972 song "Troglodyte (Cave Man)" by The Jimmy Castor Bunch. The album's second single, "Baby I", was released in July. Its third single, "Right There", featuring Detroit rapper Big Sean, was released in August 2013. They respectively peaked at number 21 and 84 on the Billboard Hot 100.

Grande recorded the duet "Almost Is Never Enough" with Nathan Sykes of The Wanted, which was released as a promotional single in August 2013. She also joined Justin Bieber on his Believe Tour for three shows and kicked off her own headlining mini-tour, The Listening Sessions. The following month, Billboard magazine ranked Grande at number four on their list of "Music's Hottest Minors 2013", an annual ranking of the most popular musicians under the age of 21. At the 2013 American Music Awards, she won the award for New Artist of the Year. She released a four-song Christmas EP, Christmas Kisses in December 2013. Grande received the Breakthrough Artist of the Year award from the Music Business Association, recognizing her achievements throughout 2013. By January 2014, Grande had begun recording her second studio album, with singer-songwriter Ryan Tedder and record producers Benny Blanco and Max Martin. The same month, she earned the Favorite Breakout Artist award at the People's Choice Awards 2014. In March 2014, Grande sang at the White House concert, "Women of Soul: In Performance at the White House". The following month, President Barack Obama and First Lady Michelle Obama invited Grande again to perform at the White House for the Easter Egg Roll event.

Grande released her second studio album My Everything on August 25, 2014, and debuted atop the Billboard 200. Its lead single "Problem" features Australian rapper Iggy Azalea and premiered at the 2014 Radio Disney Music Awards on April 26, 2014. The song debuted at number three (eventually climbing to number two) on the Billboard Hot 100, and debuted at number one on the UK Singles Chart, becoming Grande's first number one single in the United Kingdom. The album's second single, "Break Free", featuring German musician and producer Zedd, peaked at number four in the United States. She performed the song as the opening of the 2014 MTV Video Music Awards, and won Best Pop Video for "Problem". Grande and Nicki Minaj provided guest vocals on "Bang Bang", the lead single from Jessie J's album Sweet Talker, which peaked at number one in the UK and reached number three in the US. With the singles "Problem", "Break Free", and "Bang Bang", Grande joined Adele as the only female artist with three top ten singles simultaneously on the Billboard Hot 100 as a lead artist.

Grande was the musical performer on Saturday Night Live, with Chris Pratt as the host on September 27, 2014. That same month, third single from My Everything, "Love Me Harder", featuring Canadian recording artist The Weeknd, was released and peaked at number seven in the United States. The song became her fourth top ten single of 2014, the most by any artist that year. In November 2014, Grande was featured in Major Lazer's song "All My Love" from the soundtrack album for the film The Hunger Games: Mockingjay – Part 1 (2014). The same month, Grande released a Christmas song titled "Santa Tell Me" as a single from the reissue of her first Christmas EP, Christmas Kisses (2014). Billboard listed the single, among the greatest Holiday song of all time. The following month, she appeared on Nicki Minaj's third album The Pinkprint, with the song Get On Your Knees. She later released the fifth and the final single from My Everything, "One Last Time", which peaked at number 13 in the US.

In February 2015, Grande embarked on her first worldwide concert tour, The Honeymoon Tour, to further promote My Everything, with shows in North America, Europe, Asia and South America. Grande was featured on Cashmere Cat's song "Adore", which was released in March 2015. In the spring, she signed an exclusive publishing contract with the Universal Music Publishing Group, covering her entire music catalog. Grande also filmed an episode for the Fox Broadcasting Company reality TV series Knock Knock Live (2015), but the show was canceled before her episode aired. She also guest-starred on several episodes of the Fox comedy-horror television series Scream Queens as Sonya Herfmann/Chanel#2 from September to November 2015.; and  She recorded the duet "E Più Ti Penso" with Italian recording artist Andrea Bocelli, which was released in October 2015 as the lead single from Bocelli's album Cinema (2015), and covered the song "Zero to Hero", originally from the animated film Hercules (1997), for the compilation album We Love Disney (2015). Grande also released her second Christmas EP, Christmas & Chill in December 2015.

2015–2017: Dangerous Woman
Grande began recording songs for her third studio album, Dangerous Woman, originally titled Moonlight, in 2015. In October of that year, she released the single "Focus", initially intended as the lead single from the album; the song debuted at number seven on the Billboard Hot 100. The next month American singer Who Is Fancy released the single "Boys Like You", which features her and Meghan Trainor. She was featured in the remix version of "Over and Over Again", a song by English singer Nathan Sykes' debut studio solo album Unfinished Business, which was released in January 2016. Grande made a cameo appearance in the comedy film Zoolander 2 starring Ben Stiller and Owen Wilson. In March 2016, Grande released "Dangerous Woman" as the lead single from the retitled album of the same name. The single debuted at number ten on the Billboard Hot 100, becoming the first artist to have the lead single from each of her first three albums debut in the top ten. The same month, Grande appeared as host and musical guest of Saturday Night Live, where she performed "Dangerous Woman" and debuted the promotional single "Be Alright", which charted at number 43 on the Billboard Hot 100. Grande garnered positive reviews for her appearance on the show, including praise for her impressions of various singers, some of which she had done on The Tonight Show. Grande won an online voting poll on Entertainment Weekly as the "best host of the season". In May 2016, Grande appeared on The Voice season 10 finale, performing the second single from the album, "Into You", which peaked at number 13 in the United States, and duetted with Christina Aguilera on "Dangerous Woman". In March 2021, she returned to the show as a coach of the twenty-first season of The Voice; Grande became the highest-paid coach in the show's history, earning a reported $25 million per season. Grande did not return for the show's twenty-second season.

Grande released Dangerous Woman on May 20, 2016, and debuted at number two on the Billboard 200. It also debuted at number two in Japan, and at number one in several other markets, including Australia, the Netherlands, Ireland, Italy, New Zealand and UK. Mark Savage, writing for BBC News, called the album "a mature, confident record". At the Summertime Ball at London's Wembley Stadium in June, Grande performed three songs from the album as part of her set. In August, Grande released a third single from the album, "Side to Side", featuring rapper Nicki Minaj, her eighth top ten entry on the Hot 100, which peaked at number four on that chart. Dangerous Woman was nominated for Grammy Award for Best Pop Vocal Album and the title track for Best Pop Solo Performance.

In August 2016, Grande performed a tribute to the late Whitney Houston on the season finale of the ABC television series Greatest Hits and headlined the opening night of the second annual Billboard Hot 100 Music Festival, performing a nearly hour-long set of her own songs. Aside from music, Grande filmed a commercial for T-Mobile that premiered in October 2016 and played Penny Pingleton in the NBC television broadcast Hairspray Live!, which aired in December 2016. The same month, Grande and Stevie Wonder appeared on the season finale of the US competition TV series The Voice, performing their collaboration "Faith" from the soundtrack of the 2016 animated film Sing. "Faith" was nominated for Best Original Song at the 74th Golden Globe Awards. At the end of the year, Grande participated in the Jingle Ball Tour 2016. Grande recorded the title track of the soundtrack for the 2017 live-action remake of Disney's 1991 animated film Beauty and the Beast. The recording was released as a duet with American singer John Legend in February 2017. The same month, Grande embarked on her third concert tour, the Dangerous Woman Tour, to promote the related album. On March 31, 2017, Calvin Harris released a song titled "Heatstroke" from his album Funk Wav Bounces Vol. 1, which featured Grande, Young Thug, and Pharrell Williams. On April 27, 2017, Norwegian DJ Cashmere Cat released the fifth song "Quit" from his debut album 9 featuring Grande.

On May 22, 2017, her concert at Manchester Arena was the target of a suicide bombing—a shrapnel-laden homemade bomb detonated by an Islamic extremist as people were leaving the arena. The Manchester Arena bombing caused 22 deaths and injured hundreds more. Grande suspended the remainder of the tour and held a televised benefit concert, One Love Manchester, on June 4, helping to raise $23 million to aid the bombing's victims and affected families. The concert featured performances from Grande, as well as Liam Gallagher, Robbie Williams, Justin Bieber, Katy Perry, Miley Cyrus and other artists. To recognize her efforts, the Manchester City Council named Grande the first honorary citizen of Manchester. The tour resumed on June 7 in Paris and ended in September 2017. In August 2017, Grande appeared in an Apple Music Carpool Karaoke episode, singing musical theatre songs with American entertainer Seth MacFarlane. In December 2017, Billboard magazine named her "Female Artist of the Year".

2018–2019: Sweetener and Thank U, Next
Grande began working on songs for her fourth studio album, Sweetener, with Pharrell Williams in 2016, but "the events in Manchester gave a hard reset to the project's expectations". Grande released "No Tears Left to Cry" as the lead single from Sweetener in April 2018, with the song debuting at number three on the Billboard Hot 100, making Grande the only artist to have debuted the first single from each of her first four albums in the top ten of the Hot 100. In June 2018, she was featured in "Bed", the second single from Nicki Minaj's fourth studio album Queen. The same month, she was featured on Troye Sivan's single "Dance to This" from his sophomore album Bloom. The second single, "God Is a Woman", peaked at number 8 on the Hot 100 and became Grande's tenth top ten single in the US. Released in August 2018, Sweetener debuted at number one on the Billboard 200 and received acclaim from critics. She simultaneously charted nine songs from the album on the Hot 100, along with a collaboration, making her the fourth female artist to reach the ten-song mark. Grande gave four concerts to promote the album, billed as The Sweetener Sessions, in New York City, Chicago, Los Angeles, and London between August 20 and September 4, 2018. In October 2018, Grande participated in the NBC broadcast, A Very Wicked Halloween, singing "The Wizard and I" from the musical Wicked. The following month, the BBC aired a one-hour special, Ariana Grande at the BBC, featuring interviews and performances.

In November 2018, Grande released the single "Thank U, Next" and announced her fifth studio album of the same name. The song debuted at number one on the Billboard Hot 100, becoming Grande's first chart topping single in the United States, spending seven non-consecutive weeks atop. Since then, it has been certified five-times platinum in the United States; the song's music video broke records for most-watched music video on YouTube within 24 hours of release and fastest Vevo video to reach 100 million views on YouTube, both of which were later surpassed by other artists. On Spotify, it became the fastest song to reach 100 million streams (11 days) and most-streamed song by a female artist in a 24-hour period, with 9.6 million streams, before being surpassed by her own song "7 Rings" (nearly 15 million streams). Later the same month, Grande released, in collaboration with YouTube, a four-part docuseries titled Ariana Grande: Dangerous Woman Diaries. It shows behind the scenes and concert footage from Grande's Dangerous Woman Tour, including moments from the One Love Manchester concert, and follows her professional life during the tour and the making of Sweetener. The series debuted on November 29, 2018. By the end of the year, she became the most streamed female artist on Spotify, and was named Billboard's Woman of the Year. In January 2019, it was announced that Grande would be headlining the Coachella Valley Music and Arts Festival, where she became the youngest and only the fourth female artist ever to headline the festival. It took place April 12–14 and April 19–21. Grande brought a number of guest artists to perform with her, including NSYNC, P. Diddy, Nicki Minaj and Justin Bieber. Her set has received critical acclaim.

Grande's second single from Thank U, Next, "7 Rings", was released on January 18, 2019, and debuted at number one on the Billboard Hot 100 for the week of February 2, becoming her second single in a row (and overall) to top the charts. It made Grande the third female artist with multiple number-one debuts after Mariah Carey (3) and Britney Spears (2) and fifth artist overall after Justin Bieber and Drake. The song broke several streaming and recording industry records. Spending eight non-consecutive weeks at number one, it became Grande's most successful song on the chart and one of the best selling singles worldwide. Thank U, Next was released on February 8, 2019, and debuted at number one on the Billboard 200 while receiving acclaim from critics. It broke the records for the largest streaming week for a pop album and for a female album in the United States with 307 million on-demand streams.

Grande became the first solo artist to occupy the top three spots on the Billboard Hot 100 with "7 Rings" at number one, her third single "Break Up with Your Girlfriend, I'm Bored" debuting at number two, and her lead single "Thank U, Next" rose to number three, and the overall second artist to do so since the Beatles did in 1964 when they occupied the top five spots. In the United Kingdom, Grande became the second female solo artist to simultaneously hold the number one and two spots and the first musical artist to replace herself at number one, twice consecutively. In February 2019, it was reported Grande wouldn't attend the Grammy Awards after she had a disagreement with producers over a potential performance at the ceremony. Grande ended up earning her first Grammy, for Best Pop Vocal Album, for Sweetener. The same month, Grande won a Brit Award for International Female Solo Artist. She also embarked on her third headlining tour, the Sweetener World Tour, to promote both Sweetener and Thank U, Next, which began on March 18, 2019. Grande was nominated for 9 awards at the 2019 Billboard Music Awards, including Top Artist. She would win two awards for Billboard Chart Achievement and Top Female Artist on May 1, 2019. Grande performed at the event via a pre-recorded performance from her Sweetener World Tour.

In June 2019, Grande announced that she co-executive produced the soundtrack to the film Charlie's Angels; a collaboration with Miley Cyrus and Lana Del Rey, titled "Don't Call Me Angel", was released as the lead single on September 13, 2019. It was later nominated for Best Original Song, at the 24th Satellite Awards. In August 2019, she released a single titled "Boyfriend" with pop duo Social House. Grande co-wrote singer Normani's debut solo single "Motivation", which was released on August 16, 2019. Grande won three awards at the 2019 MTV Video Music Awards, including the Artist of the Year award. She was nominated for 12 awards in total, including Video of the Year for "Thank U, Next". Grande was featured on the remix of American singer and rapper Lizzo's song "Good as Hell", which was released on October 25, 2019. By the end of the year, Billboard named Grande the most accomplished female artist to debut in the 2010s, while NME named her one of the defining music artists of the decade. She also became the most streamed female artist of the decade on music streaming service Spotify. Also, Forbes ranked her amongst the highest-paid celebrities in 2019, placing at number 62 on the list, while Billboard ranked her as 2019's highest-paid solo musician.

2020–present: Positions and Wicked
In January 2020, Grande received multiple nominations at the 2020 iHeartRadio Music Awards, including Female Artist of the Year. The following month, she made a guest appearance in the second season of the American television series Kidding, which stars Jim Carrey. On March 27, 2020, she appeared on Childish Gambino's fourth studio album 3.15.20 on the track "Time". Grande and Justin Bieber released a collaboration song titled "Stuck with U" on May 8, 2020; net proceeds from the sales of the song were donated to the First Responders Children's Foundation in light of the COVID-19 pandemic. The song debuted at number one on the Billboard Hot 100, becoming Grande's third chart-topping single. Alongside Bieber, both artists tied Mariah Carey and Drake for the most songs to debut at number one on the Hot 100; Grande is the first artist to have her first three number ones debut at the top, following "Thank U, Next" and "7 Rings". Grande also released a collaboration with Lady Gaga, "Rain on Me", as the second single from Gaga's sixth studio album Chromatica. The song also debuted at number one on the Billboard Hot 100, becoming Grande's fourth number-one single and helping Grande break the record for the most number-one debuts on that chart. The song won the Best Pop Duo/Group Performance category at the 63rd Annual Grammy Awards. In 2020, Grande became the highest-earning woman in music on Forbess 2020 Celebrity 100 list, placing 17th overall with $72 million. At the 2020 MTV Video Music Awards, she was nominated for nine awards for both "Stuck with U" (with Bieber) and "Rain on Me" (with Gaga). For the latter, Grande received her third consecutive nomination for Video of the Year. She won four awards, including Song of the Year for "Rain on Me".

Grande's sixth studio album, Positions, was released on October 30, 2020. It debuted at number one on the Billboard 200, becoming Grande's fifth number-one album. The eponymous lead single was released on October 23. It debuted at number one on the Billboard Hot 100, becoming Grande's fifth chart-topping single and breaking numerous records. Grande became the first artist to have five number-one debuts on the Hot 100 and the first to have their first five number ones debut at the top. "Positions" became her third number-one single in 2020 following "Stuck with U" and "Rain on Me", making Grande the first artist since Drake to have three number-one singles in a single calendar year and the first female artist to do so since Rihanna and Katy Perry in 2010. Alongside the release of Positions, the song from the album "34+35" served as the second single off the album. The song debuted at number 8, becoming Grande's 18th top ten single. Grande released a "34+35" remix featuring American rappers Doja Cat and Megan Thee Stallion on January 15, 2021. The remix helped the song reach a new peak at number two, the highest-charting song credited to three or more female soloists on the Hot 100 since Christina Aguilera, Mýa, Pink and Lil' Kim's "Lady Marmalade" in 2001. The remix was one of five additional tracks included on the deluxe edition of Positions, released on February 19, 2021. In March, the song "POV" was sent to radio as the album's third single. The song reached number 27 on the Hot 100 and would reach the top ten on mainstream radio, making Grande would become the first artist to have three concurrent songs in the top ten for Pop Airplay. Grande was named the most-played artist on iHeartRadio's stations in 2021, reaching 2.6 billion in audience.

On October 14, 2020, it was announced, that Grande would appear alongside Leonardo DiCaprio, Jennifer Lawrence, and Meryl Streep in Adam McKay's Don't Look Up. The film was released on the streaming service Netflix, on December 24, 2021. With streams of more than 152 million hours in a week, it broke the record for the biggest week of views in Netflix history. To promote the film, Grande released the song "Just Look Up", in collaboration with rapper Kid Cudi, on December 3, 2021. At the 27th Critics' Choice Awards, Grande received nominations in the categories Best Song and Best Acting Ensemble, as a part of the cast. She also received a nomination at the 28th Screen Actors Guild Awards for Outstanding Performance by a Cast in a Motion Picture. On November 13, 2020, Grande made a surprise appearance on the Adult Swim Festival, performing alongside music artist Thundercat, performing his song "Them Changes", which Grande had previously covered. Grande and Jennifer Hudson also featured on a remix of Mariah Carey's 2010 Christmas song "Oh Santa!". The song was released on December 4, 2020, as part of Mariah Carey's Magical Christmas Special. Grande released the concert film for her Sweetener World Tour, Excuse Me, I Love You, on December 21, 2020, exclusively on Netflix.

In April, Grande featured on a remix of the Weeknd's "Save Your Tears". The remix reached number one on the Billboard Hot 100, becoming both artists' sixth number one single. She joined Paul McCartney as the only artists to earn three number one duets on the Hot 100. The remix also became, with 69 weeks, one of the songs with the most total weeks on the chart. Grande and the Weeknd performed "Save Your Tears" together at the 2021 iHeartRadio Music Awards. In June, Grande featured on the song "I Don't Do Drugs" from Doja Cat's third studio album Planet Her. Her contribution as a songwriter and featured artist on the song earned Grande a nomination for Album of the Year at the 64th Annual Grammy Awards. Later that month, she debuted seven live performances on Vevo. Grande performed virtually as the headline act of the "Rift Tour" on the video game Fortnite from August 6 to 8, 2021. Forbes estimated that Grande would earn over $20 million from merchandise sales alone. The concert attracted 78 million players, beating Travis Scott's record of 11.7 million views for his own concert, and helped fuel a spike in streams for the songs included in her set.

In November 2021, it was announced that Grande would play Glinda for the upcoming two-part film adaptation of the musical Wicked, directed by Jon M. Chu and starring alongside Cynthia Erivo, who will play Elphaba. The first part, Wicked: Part One, is slated to be released on Christmas day 2024.

Artistry
Musical style and genres

Grande's music is generally pop and R&B with elements of EDM, hip hop, and trap, the latter first appearing prominently on her Christmas & Chill extended play. While consistently maintaining pop-R&B tones, she has increased incorporation of trap into her music as her career has progressed, thanks to her work with record producer Tommy Brown. She has collaborated with Brown on every album thus far and stated that "one of the things I love most about working with Tommy is that none of the beats he plays me ever sound the same." Grande learned how to sound engineer and produce her own vocals because she "love[s] being hands on" with every project, revealing that Mac Miller taught her how to use the digital audio workstation Pro Tools. Collaborator Justin Tranter remarked that he felt inspired seeing how involved Grande is in creating her music "from the writing to the vision to the storytelling and to even engineering and comping her own vocals." She has co-written songs addressing a wide variety of themes, such as love, sex, wealth, breakups, independence, empowerment, self-love and moving on from the past.

Grande's debut album Yours Truly was complimented for recreating the R&B "vibe and feel of the 90s" with the help of songwriter and producer Babyface. Her follow-up record, My Everything, was described as an evolution to a new sound exploring EDM and electropop genres. Grande expanded the pop and R&B sound on her third album, Dangerous Woman, which was praised by the Los Angeles Times for integrating elements of different styles, including reggae-pop ("Side to Side"), dance-pop ("Be Alright"), and guitar-trap fusion ("Sometimes"). Trap-pop is more heavily featured on her fourth and fifth studio albums, Sweetener and Thank U, Next. On Sweetener, Elias Leight of Rolling Stone opines that Grande "set her sights on conquering trap, savage basslines and jittery swarms of drum programming" and "embraces the sound of hard-bitten Southern hip-hop", exploring funk music with themes of love and prosperity. Craig Jenkins of Vulture noted that Grande changed her musical style to trap and hip hop with undertones of R&B on Thank U, Next, with lyrics about breakups, empowerment, and self-love. Her sixth album, Positions, further explores the R&B and trap-pop sound of Sweetener and Thank U, Next, with lyrics discussing sex and romance.

Influences

Grande grew up listening mainly to urban pop and 1990s music. She credited Gloria Estefan with inspiring her to pursue a music career, after Estefan saw and complimented Grande's performance on a cruise ship when she was eight years old. Mariah Carey and Whitney Houston are her biggest vocal influences: "I love Mariah Carey. She is literally my favorite human being on the planet. And of course Whitney [Houston] as well. As far as vocal influences go, Whitney and Mariah pretty much cover it." Alongside Carey and Houston, Grande's other key influences include Destiny's Child, Beyoncé, Celine Dion and Madonna. She reflects on her childhood by posting videos of herself singing songs from Dion's 1997 album Let's Talk About Love on her social media. Grande credits Madonna for "pav[ing] the way for me and also every other female artist" and admitted to being "obsessed with her entire discography".

Grande praised Imogen Heap's "intricate" song structure. she has named Judy Garland as a childhood influence, admiring her ability to tell "a story when she sings"; and says that "Over the Rainbow" was one of the first songs she remembers singing because "Wizard Of Oz was always my favorite movie when I was younger." Music producer and Grande collaborator Savan Kotecha has stated in multiple interviews that him and Grande were influenced by Lauryn Hill, when creating her fourth album Sweetener, as well as the song "No Tears Left to Cry". Kotecha told Variety "we were listening to Lauryn Hill about chord changes and why we stick to four chords all the time".

Musically, Grande admires India.Arie because her "music makes me feel like everything is going to be okay" and loves Brandy's songs because "her riffs are incredibly on point." She has also expressed admiration for rappers who impact the music industry without a planned release date, telling Billboard, "My dream has always been to be—obviously not a rapper, but, like, to put out music in the way that a rapper does. I feel like there are certain standards that pop women are held to that men aren't. ... It's just like, 'Bruh, I just want to ... drop [music] the way these boys do." It inspired her to release "Thank U, Next" without any prior announcement, which The Ringer called "more of a Drake move than an Ariana Grande move."

Voice
Grande is a light lyric soprano, possessing a four-octave vocal range and a whistle register. With the release of Yours Truly, critics compared Grande to Mariah Carey because of her wide vocal range, sound and musical material. Julianne Escobedo Shepherd of Billboard wrote that both Carey and Grande have "the talent to let their vocals do the talking ... that's not where the similarities end. ... Grande is subverting it with cute, comfortable, and on-trend dresses with a feminine slant." Grande responded to the comparisons, "[I]t's a huge compliment, but when you hear my entire album, you'll see that Mariah's sound is much different than mine." Steven J. Horowitz of Billboard wrote in 2014, "With her sophomore album, the 'Problem' singer no longer resembles [Carey]—and that's okay."

Mark Savage of BBC News commented, "Grande is one of pop's most intriguing and gifted singers. A magnetic performer with unrivalled vocal control". In The New York Times, Jon Pareles wrote that Grande's voice "can be silky, breathy or cutting, swooping through long melismas or jabbing out short R&B phrases; it's always supple and airborne, never forced." Composer and playwright Jason Robert Brown addressed Grande in a 2016 Time magazine article: "[N]o matter how much you are underestimated ... you are going to open your mouth and that unbelievable sound is going to come out. That extraordinary, versatile, limitless instrument that allows you to shut down every objection and every obstacle."

Public image

Grande cited Audrey Hepburn as a major style influence in her early years of fame, but began to find emulating Hepburn's style "a little boring" as her career has progressed. She also drew inspiration from actresses of the 1950s and 1960s, such as Ann-Margret, Nancy Sinatra and Marilyn Monroe. Grande's modest look early in her career was described as "age appropriate" in comparison to contemporary artists who grew up in the public eye. Jim Farber of the New York Daily News wrote in 2014 that Grande received less attention "for how little she wears or how graphically she moves than for how she sings." That year, she abandoned her earlier style and began wearing short skirts and crop tops with knee-high boots in live performances and red carpet events. She also began regularly wearing cat and bunny ears. In recent years, she began wearing oversized jackets and hoodies. Grande's style is often imitated by social media influencers and celebrities. After years of dyeing her hair red for the role of Cat Valentine, Grande wore extensions as her hair recovered from the damage. Anne T. Donahue of MTV News noted that her "iconic" high ponytail has received more attention than her fashion choices.

Although Grande drew criticism for alleged impolite interactions with reporters and fans in 2014, she dismissed the reports as "weird, inaccurate depictions". Rolling Stone wrote: "Some may cry 'diva', but it's also Grande just taking a stand to not allow others to control her image." In July 2015, Grande sparked controversy after being seen on surveillance video in a doughnut shop licking doughnuts that were on display and saying "I hate Americans. I hate America. This is disgusting", referring to a tray of doughnuts. She subsequently apologized, saying that she is "EXTREMELY proud to be an American" and that her comments rather referred to obesity in the United States. She later released a video apology for "behaving poorly". The incident was parodied by The Muppets and featured in Miley Cyrus's Saturday Night Live cover of "My Way", about the regrets of the summer of 2015. Grande herself poked fun at the incident while hosting Saturday Night Live in 2016, saying, "A lot of kid stars end up doing drugs, or in jail, or pregnant, or get caught licking a doughnut they didn't pay for." In 2020, she said that she stopped doing interviews for a while out of fear that her words would be misconstrued and she would be labeled a "diva".

Grande has a large following on social media, and is one of the most influential celebrities on the internet. , her YouTube channel has over 50 million subscribers, making her among the most subscribed solo female artist; her music videos have been viewed a total of over 23 billion times, with seven of them reaching 1 billion views; her Spotify profile has amassed over 85 million followers, making her the second most followed artist and most followed female; her Instagram account has over 350 million followers, making her the top five among most followed individual and third-most followed female; her now deactivated Twitter account had over 80 million followers, making it the seventh most followed account; her Facebook page has over 40 million followers, and her TikTok has 29.4 million followers. Grande became the most followed woman on Instagram in 2019. In May 2021, Visual Capitalist ranked Grande as the world's top female social media influencer.

Often regarded as a pop icon and triple threat entertainer, several wax figures of Grande are found at Madame Tussauds Wax Museums in major cities around the world, including New York, Orlando, Amsterdam, Bangkok, Hollywood and London.

Impact and influence

In 2016 and 2019, Grande was named one of Times 100 most influential people in the world. In 2017, Celia Almeida of the Miami New Times wrote that of all the biggest pop stars of the past 20 years, Grande made the most convincing transition "from ingénue to independent female artist." In 2018, music magazine Hits labeled her "pop diva supreme" and "reigning pop diva of the times", and Bloomberg named her the "first pop diva of the streaming generation" in 2020. Grande was also included in Pitchfork's list of "The 200 Most Important Artists of Pitchfork's First 25 Years" for "emerging with music that pushed her artistry further as it asserted a magical trifecta of hope, joy, and a powerhouse voice". Her song "Thank U, Next" was in Rolling Stone 2021 revision of their 500 Greatest Songs of All Time.  In 2023, the magazine included Grande among the 200 Greatest Singers of All Time.  

Many recording artists have cited Grande as an influence, including Madison Beer, Sufjan Stevens, Melanie Martinez, Meghan Trainor, Troye Sivan, Jungkook from BTS,  Maria Becerra, Billie Eilish,  Yeri from Red Velvet, Sabrina Carpenter, Danna Paola,Zara Larsson, Melody, Bryson Tiller,  Lana Del Rey, Dove Cameron, Michelle Zauner from Japanese Breakfast, Grace Vanderwaal, Breanna Yde, Maggie Lindemann, Charlie Puth, Giselle from Aespa, and Blackpink.

Achievements

Throughout her career, Grande has sold over 85 to 90 million records worldwide, making her one of the best-selling music artists of all time. All of Grande's full-length albums have been certified platinum or higher by the RIAA and they spend at least one year on the Billboard 200 chart. 

Having amassed 98 billion streams thus far, Grande is the most streamed female artist and one of the most streamed artists of all time; she is the most streamed female artist on Spotify (2010s decade) and Apple Music. Grande is with over 30 billion streams among the top ten of the most streamed artists, being only one of two female artists on the ranking. She became the most streamed female artist on Spotify, surpassing Rihanna, and held the record for over two years, after being overtaken herself. Her songs and albums are some of the most streamed of all time. Grande became the first woman with one and two billion streams with one album, 3.5 billion streams on three separate albums, the first artist to have five albums with four billion streams, and the first female artist who surpassed one billion streams with nine songs each. As of 2023, she's also the most followed female artist on Spotify.  

Grande has won two Grammy Awards, one BRIT Award, nine MTV Video Music Awards, three MTV Europe Music Awards and three American Music Awards. She has received 34 Billboard Music Award nominations and won two in 2019, including Top Female Artist. Grande has won nine Nickelodeon Kids' Choice Awards, including one in 2014 for Favorite TV Actress for her performance on Sam & Cat, and three People's Choice Awards. In 2014, she received the Breakthrough Artist of the Year Award from the Music Business Association and Best Newcomer at the Bambi Awards. She has won six iHeartRadio Music Awards and twelve Teen Choice Awards. She was named Billboard Women in Music's Rising Star in 2014 and Woman of the Year in 2018, the greatest pop star of 2019, with honorable mention in 2014 and 2018, and the most successful female artist to debut in the 2010s by Billboard. 
 She is the sixth highest-certified female digital singles artist in the U.S., with 63.5 million total equivalent units certified by the Recording Industry Association of America (RIAA). Grande is also one of the most certified artists in the UK, with nearly 25 million units.

Grande has broken numerous Hot 100 records. Seven singles by Grande have topped the US Billboard Hot 100, her most recent being "Die for You". Grande has a total of fourteen top ten debuts thus far, beginning with her first single "The Way"; the lead single from each of her first five studio albums have debuted in the top ten, making her the only artist to achieve this. In 2020, she became the first act to have her first five number one singles, "Thank U, Next", "7 Rings", "Stuck With U", "Rain on Me", and "Positions" debut at number one; that year, Grande also broke the record for the most number one debuts and became the first female artist topping Global 200, Global 200 Excl. US and Hot 100 simultaneously. Grande would also become the first artist to have three singles debut at number one on a single calendar year. She later broke the record for most simultaneously charting songs on the top 40 of the Hot 100 for a female artist with the release of her fifth studio album, Thank U, Next, when eleven of the twelve tracks charted within the region (later surpassed by Billie Eilish). The three singles from Thank U, Next, "7 Rings", "Break Up with Your Girlfriend, I'm Bored", and "Thank U, Next" charted at numbers one, two, and three respectively on the week of February 23, 2019, making Grande the first solo artist to occupy the top three spots of the Billboard Hot 100 and the first artist to do so since the Beatles in 1964. With her album Thank U, Next, Grande set the record for the largest streaming week for a pop album and for a female artist, with 307 million on-demand audio streams. With "Die For You" with The Weeknd reaching number one, Grande surpassed Paul McCartney as the artist with the most number one duets in Hot 100 history, with four songs. As of March 2023, Grande has 73 entries on the Hot 100, tying Aretha Franklin as the fourth female artist with the most Hot 100 entries. She was also named the Billboard Year-End Top Female Artist for 2017 and 2019 and was named the sixth top female artist (twelfth overall) on the magazine's Decade-End Top Artists Chart for the 2010s.
 The magazine also ranked her 78th on the Greatest of All Time Hot 100 Artists Charts, respectively.

As of 2023, Grande has broken thirty-three Guinness World Records. These records included the most songs to debut at No. 1 on the Billboard Hot 100, most followers on Spotify (female), most monthly listeners on Spotify (female), most streamed act on Spotify (female), most streamed track in one week by a female artist on the Billboard charts, fastest hat-trick of UK No. 1 singles by a female artist, first female artist to replace herself at No. 1 on UK singles chart, first solo artist to replace themselves at No. 1 on UK singles chart for two consecutive weeks, most subscribers for a musician on YouTube (female), most streamed album by a female artist in one week (UK), among others. Eleven records were achieved from the success of her album Thank U, Next and was featured in the 2020 Edition.

Other ventures
Philanthropy and activism
At age ten, Grande co-founded the South Florida youth singing group Kids Who Care, which performed at charitable fund-raisers and raised over $500,000 in 2007 alone. In 2009, as a member of the charitable organization Broadway in South Africa, she and her brother Frankie performed and taught music and dance to children in Gugulethu, South Africa.

She was featured with Bridgit Mendler and Kat Graham in Seventeen magazine in a 2013 public campaign to end online bullying called "Delete Digital Drama". After watching the film Blackfish that year, she urged fans to stop supporting SeaWorld. In September 2014, Grande participated at the charitable Stand Up to Cancer television program, performing her song "My Everything" in memory of her grandfather, who had died of cancer that July. Grande has adopted several rescue dogs as pets and has promoted pet adoption at her concerts. In 2016, she launched a line of lip shades, "Ariana Grande's MAC Viva Glam", with MAC Cosmetics, the profits of which benefited people affected by HIV and AIDS.

In 2015, Grande and Miley Cyrus performed a cover of Crowded House's "Don't Dream It's Over" as part of Cyrus' "Backyard Sessions" to benefit her Happy Hippie Foundation, which helps homeless and LGBT youths. Later that year, Grande headlined the Dance On the Pier event, part of the LGBT Pride Week in New York City.; and  As a feminist, Grande wrote a well-received, "empowering" essay on Twitter decrying the double standard and misogyny in the focus of the press on female musicians' relationships and sex lives instead of "their value as an individual".; and  She noted that she has "more to talk about" concerning her music and accomplishments rather than her romantic relationships. In 2016, E! writer Kendall Fisher called her "a feminist hero". That year, Grande joined Madonna to raise funds for orphaned children in Malawi; she and Victoria Monét recorded "Better Days" in support of the Black Lives Matter movement. To aid the victims of the Manchester Arena bombing in 2017, Grande organized the One Love Manchester concert and re-released "One Last Time" and her live performance of "Over the Rainbow" at the event as charity singles. The total amount raised was reportedly $23 million (more than £17 million), and she received praise for her "grace and strength" in leading the benefit concert. Madeline Roth of MTV wrote that the performance "bolstered courage among an audience that desperately needed it. ... Returning to the stage was a true act of bravery and resilience". In 2017, New York magazine's Vulture section ranked the event as the No. 1 concert of the year, and Billboard Mitchell Harrison called Grande a "gay icon" for her LGBT-friendly lyrics and performances and "support for the LGBTQ community".

In September 2017, Grande performed in A Concert for Charlottesville which benefitted the victims of the August 2017 white nationalist rally in Charlottesville, Virginia. In March 2018, she participated in March for Our Lives to support gun control reform. Grande donated the proceeds from the first show in Atlanta on her Sweetener World Tour to Planned Parenthood in a response to the passage of a number of anti-abortion laws in several states including Georgia. During the COVID-19 pandemic, Grande donated between $500 and $1,000 each to a number of fans as financial support. Grande also supported a COVID-19 fund named Project 100, which aimed to provide $1,000 digital payments to 100,000 families who have been greatly impacted by the pandemic. In May 2020, Grande announced that all net proceeds from her collaboration with singer Justin Bieber, "Stuck With U", would be donated to the First Responders Children's Foundation to fund grants and scholarships for children of frontline workers who are working during the global pandemic. That month, Grande joined a Los Angeles protest against the murder of George Floyd, demanding justice and asking fans to sign petitions condemning the act of police brutality. She highlighted white privilege and called for more activism outside social media. The following month, she praised a Black-owned coffee shop on Instagram, and encouraged her LA-based followers to support the business. This came shortly after Grande unfollowed Starbucks on social media, a company that she previously praised and collaborated with. She apparently withdrew her support after the company's ban of Black Lives Matter apparel, which has since been lifted. In December 2020, Grande, and Scott and Brian Nicholson, her choreographers and friends, launched "Orange Twins Rescue", an animal rescue center based in Los Angeles. In recent years, Grande surprised kids, who spend the holiday at children's hospitals in L.A. and the UK, with gifts from wish lists at the UCLA Mattel Children's Hospital and the Royal Manchester Children's Hospital, among others. Manchester Foundation Trust Charity revealed that Grande had gifted nearly 1,000 presents to patients across the hospital network’s children’s wards and newborn intensive care units in 2021. 

In June 2021, Grande, along with a dozen other celebrities signed an open letter to Congress to pass the Equality Act highlighting the Act would protect "marginalized communities". In the same month, Grande partnered with the online portal BetterHelp, and gave away $2 million worth of therapy to fans. On International Transgender Day of Visibility, she launched a fund for transgender youth, pledging to match every donation up until $1.5 million. In May 2022, Grande was among 160 artists and influencers, who signed a 'Bans Off Our Bodies' full-page advertisement in The New York Times, in support of abortion rights in the US. In June, Grande endorsed Karen Bass for 2022 Los Angeles mayoral election.

Business and ventures

Products and endorsements

In October 2014, Grande joined the bottled water brand WAT-AAH! as an equity holder and partner. In November 2015, she released a limited edition handbag in collaboration with Coach. In January 2016, she launched a makeup collection with MAC Cosmetics, donating 100% of proceeds to the MAC AIDS Fund. In February 2016, Grande launched a fashion line with Lipsy London. Later that year, she teamed up with Brookstone, using the concept art of artist Wenqing Yan, to design cat ear headphones. In 2017, Grande collaborated with Square Enix to create a character based on herself for the mobile game Final Fantasy Brave Exvius. Grande was a limited time unlockable character as part of the Dangerous Woman Tour event, which also included an orchestral remix of Grande's song "Touch It"; the character, Dangerous Ariana, is a magical support character who uses music-based attacks. In September 2017, she became a brand ambassador for Reebok. In August 2018, she partnered with American Express for The Sweetener Sessions, a partnership which continued through the Sweetener World Tour in 2019, alongside T-Mobile. In March 2019, she partnered with Starbucks for the launch of the Cloud Macchiato beverage. In May 2019, Grande was announced as the face of Givenchy's Fall-Winter campaign. The campaign began in July and generated $25.13 million in media impact value. Beats, Samsung, Fiat, Reebok, and Guess products have been featured in Grande's music videos. She has appeared in commercials for Macy's, T-Mobile, and Apple, as well as for her own fragrances. Since 2019, Grande was among the ten of the highest paid individuals on Instagram. In 2023, Grande earns $1.6 million per sponsored Instagram post.

Fragrances

Grande has released thirteen fragrances with Luxe Brands. She launched her debut fragrance, Ari by Ariana Grande, in 2015. In the wake of its success, she launched her third fragrance, Sweet Like Candy, in 2016. Her fifth fragrance, Moonlight, was released in 2017, followed by Cloud (2018), Thank U, Next (2019), R.E.M. (2020), and God Is A Woman (2021), which was later expanded to a body care line. She then released the duo fragrance collection Mod Vanilla and Mod Blush (2022). The line also includes the limited editions Frankie (2016), Sweet Like Candy Limited Edition (2017), Thank U, Next 2.0, and Cloud Intense (both 2021). The fragrances won the FiFi Award multiple times, most recently with R.E.M. in 2021. In 2022, it was reported that Cloud was the best-selling fragrance at Ulta, selling one bottle every eleven minutes. Grande’s fragrance line is the most-searched celebrity offering, with 4.4 million searches across Google and social media platforms per year. Since its launch in 2015, the franchise has made $1 billion in retail sales globally.

R.E.M. Beauty

In November 2021, Grande launched her makeup line R.E.M. Beauty, which is distributed at Ulta Beauty as of March 2022. The Chapter One: Ultraviolet line featured 12 core products, including a range of individual shades, for both lips and eyes. In March 2022, Grande released the brand's Chapter Two: Goodnight and Go line. In addition to a selection of new skincare products—an under-eye balm, lash and brow serum, and face mist—the collection also contained makeup staples such as a versatile cheek and lipstick and additional sets of eyelash extensions. She then released Chapter 3: On Your Collar, which included various lip products, and Chapter 4:  Out Of Body, which included a concealer available in 60 different shades. Forbes reported in 2022 that R.E.M. Beauty was one of the brands boosting Ulta's driving gross margin due to strong consumer demand. In May, the line won "Best New Brand" at the Allure Best of Beauty Awards. In February 2023, it was announced, that the brand will be launching in 81 Sephora stores and 13 online sites, including across Europe.

In January 2023, Forbes announced, that Grande is set to acquire the physical assets for the brand, for an estimated $15 million from Forma Brands—the parent company of Morphe Cosmetics—after the company filed for bankruptcy earlier that month, ending their licensing agreement.

Personal life
Health and diet
Grande has said she struggled with hypoglycemia, which she attributed to poor dietary habits. She has been a vegan since 2013. Fans questioned in 2019 whether she was still a vegan after working with Starbucks to create a special edition of one of her favorite drinks which was revealed to contain eggs. Her nutritionist, Harley Pasternak, told the magazine Glamour that Grande is vegan but that he has got her to "feel OK about indulging and celebrating sometimes".

Grande developed post-traumatic stress disorder (PTSD) and anxiety after the Manchester Arena bombing; she nearly pulled out of her performance in the 2018 broadcast A Very Wicked Halloween due to anxiety. Grande has also said she has been in therapy for over a decade, having first seen a mental health professional shortly after her parents' divorce.

Beliefs
Grande was raised Roman Catholic, but left the church during the pontificate of Benedict XVI, opposing its stance on homosexuality and noting that her half-brother Frankie is gay. She has said that she and Frankie have followed the teachings of Kabbalah, a branch of Jewish mysticism, since she was 12. She said that they believe "the basis lies in the idea that if you're kind to others, good things will happen to you". Several of her songs, such as "Break Your Heart Right Back", are supportive of LGBT rights. She has also been labeled "an advocate for a sex-positive attitude".

In November 2019, Grande endorsed Senator Bernie Sanders' second presidential bid.

Property and wealth
Grande owned a $16 million penthouse in Lower Manhattan.
She also purchased a mansion in Hollywood Hills for $13.7 million in June 2020. In September 2022, Grande put her Montecito, California house, which had a break-in three months before, up for sale. The mansion was reported to have sold for $9.1 million.

Forbes began reporting on Grande's earnings in 2019.

Relationships
Grande met actor Graham Phillips in the cast of the Broadway musical 13 in 2008 and dated him until 2011. She dated English singer Nathan Sykes between August and December 2013, and then dated rapper Big Sean from October 2014 to April 2015.

After recording "The Way" with Mac Miller in 2012, the two began dating in 2016. They collaborated on the single "My Favorite Part", released in September 2016 on Miller's album The Divine Feminine (2016). Their relationship ended by May 2018. That September, Miller died from an accidental drug overdose; Grande expressed grief over his death on social media and called him her "dearest friend".

In May 2018, Grande began dating actor and comedian Pete Davidson, and they became engaged the next month. They called off their engagement and ended the relationship in October 2018. 

Grande began dating real estate agent Dalton Gomez in January 2020. Their relationship, while mostly private, was made public in the music video of her and Justin Bieber's charity single "Stuck With U". Grande announced their engagement on December 20, 2020, after 11 months of dating. On May 15, 2021, they married in a private ceremony at her home in Montecito, California, where she wore a custom Vera Wang dress. Her wedding pictures became among the most-liked Instagram posts, with over 25 million likes.

Filmography

 Snowflake, the White Gorilla (2011)
 Underdogs (2016)
 Zoolander 2 (2016)
 Mariah Carey's Magical Christmas Special (2020)
 Ariana Grande: Excuse Me, I Love You (2020)
 Billie Eilish: The World's a Little Blurry (2021)
 Don't Look Up (2021)

DiscographyStudio albums'''
 Yours Truly (2013)
 My Everything (2014)
 Dangerous Woman (2016)
 Sweetener (2018)
 Thank U, Next (2019)
 Positions'' (2020)

Live performances and tours

Stage acting

Tours

Headlining
 The Listening Sessions (2013)
 The Honeymoon Tour (2015)
 Dangerous Woman Tour (2017)
 Sweetener World Tour (2019)

Promotional
 The Sweetener Sessions (2018)

Opening act
 Justin Bieber – Believe Tour (2013)

See also

 List of American Grammy Award winners and nominees
 List of artists who have achieved simultaneous UK and US number-one hits
 List of artists who reached number one in the United States
 List of Billboard Social 50 number-one artists
 List of highest-certified music artists in the United States
 Honorific nicknames in popular music
 UK Singles Chart records and statistics
 List of most-streamed songs on Spotify

Notes

References

External links

 
 
 

 
1993 births
21st-century American actresses
21st-century American singers
21st-century American women singers
Actresses from Florida
American child actresses
American contemporary R&B singers
American dance musicians
American electronic musicians
American women hip hop musicians
American women hip hop singers
American women pop singers
American women singer-songwriters
American former Christians
American musical theatre actresses
American people of Italian descent
American sopranos
American television actresses
American women in electronic music
Anti-bullying activists
Brit Award winners
Child pop musicians
Christian Kabbalists
Dance-pop musicians
Feminist musicians
Grammy Award winners
Judges in American reality television series
American LGBT rights activists
Living people
Former Roman Catholics
MTV Europe Music Award winners
People from Boca Raton, Florida
People with post-traumatic stress disorder
Republic Records artists
Singer-songwriters from Florida
Singers with a four-octave vocal range
Universal Music Group artists
Crime witnesses